Tamu Massif is a  seamount in the northwest Pacific Ocean, sitting atop a triple junction of mid-ocean ridges.<ref name="magnetic mix-up"  Tamu Massif is located in the Shatsky Rise about  east of Japan.

William Sager, a marine geophysicist from the Department of Earth and Atmospheric Sciences at the University of Houston, began studying Tamu Massif around 1993 at the Texas A&M College of Geosciences. In September 2013, Sager and his team concluded that Tamu Massif is "the biggest single shield volcano ever discovered on Earth". Other igneous features on the planet are larger, such as the Ontong Java Plateau, but it has not yet been determined if they are indeed just one volcano or rather complexes of several volcanoes.

Etymology
The name Tamu is taken from the initials of Texas A&M University. William Sager, a geology professor and one of the lead scientists studying the volcano, previously taught at Texas A&M. A massif, which means "massive" in French, is a large mountain or a section of the planet's crust that is demarcated by faults and flexures.

Geology
The Tamu Massif was formed about 145 million years ago during the Late Jurassic to Early Cretaceous period over a relatively short period of time (a few million years) and then became extinct. Tamu Massif was formed during a single geologically brief eruptive period, which scientists had previously thought was impossible on Earth. If confirmed, the suggestion that it could be a single volcano would make the Tamu Massif the largest known volcano on Earth, dwarfing the current record-holder, Pūhāhonu, in the Hawaiian Islands. The entire mass of Tamu consists of basalt. Its slopes are very gradual, ranging from less than half a degree to one degree near its summit. The Shatsky Rise oceanic plateau is comparable in size to California or Japan, but Tamu Massif, which is the plateau's oldest and largest edifice, is comparable in size to New Mexico, or Britain and Ireland together.

Using magnetic lineations, researchers discovered that there are three bathymetric highs and a low ridge, a topography that would imply three separate volcanoes; but the plume-head model indicates a single massive volcano. Based on multichannel seismic profiles and rock samples from Integrated Ocean Drilling Program (IODP) core sites, Tamu Massif appears to be a single massive volcano made of lava flows that emanated from the volcano centre and formed its shield shape; however, the profiles have large gaps in them, leaving open the possibility that it may represent the activity of more than one volcano. A subsequent study in 2016 found that the massif was likely generated by a single volcano. In 2015, researchers found that the volcano's structure bore patterns of magnetic striping on either side, indicating that the volcano is likely a hybrid of a mid-ocean ridge and a shield volcano. Geologic data also indicated that Tamu Massif formed at the junction of three mid-ocean ridges, which was a highly unusual occurrence.

A study found that the Moho line, the boundary between the Earth's crust and mantle, extends more than  beneath the base of Tamu Massif, meaning that the volcano is unlikely to ever erupt again, since magma is presumably unable to penetrate a barrier that thick.

See also

 Pūhāhonu - The second-largest volcano known on earth, recently discovered to be nearly twice as large as Mauna Loa
 Mauna Loa – The third-largest volcano known on Earth; also the largest known volcano extending above sea level
 Ring of Fire
 Tharsis – A massive volcanic plateau on the western hemisphere of Mars that includes Olympus Mons

References
Informational notes

Citations

External links
Sager, W., 2014, The Largest Volcano in the World-Mid Pacific Ocean. Education Videos, Houston Geological Society, Houston, Texas

Cretaceous System
Extreme points of Earth
Extinct volcanoes
Seamounts of the Pacific Ocean
Shield volcanoes
Submarine volcanoes
Volcanoes of the Pacific Ocean
Jurassic volcanoes
Cretaceous volcanoes
Triple junctions